NHL Radio is the official national radio broadcaster of the National Hockey League, covering the Stanley Cup Finals, both Conference Finals, selected early round playoff action, the All-Star Game, the NHL Winter Classic and a selected number of regular-season games. The package was distributed by Westwood One and premiered in the 1993-94 season. This arrangement lasted through the end of the 2007-08 season until it was relaunched for the 2016 Stanley Cup Finals, through the network's NBC Sports Radio service. The contract was continued for the 2016-17 season with a playoff game of the week, both conference finals, the Stanley Cup Finals, the Winter Classic and select regular season games being added. The NBC Sports Radio brand was dropped in 2020; Westwood One will syndicate the broadcasts directly. In 2021, Sports USA Radio Network took over the national radio rights to the NHL.

NHL Radio's blackout rules
Within 75 miles of a team's home arena, only stations the team or its flagship station contracts with can carry those games, regardless if the team is home or away. Thus, any competing station that carries national broadcasts cannot air those games.

Unlike Westwood One's NFL coverage and other leagues' radio coverage, there have never been any blackout restrictions on internet streaming of NHL games. Also, during the Stanley Cup Finals, there is also no requirement that only the 2 participating teams' flagship stations are allowed to carry coverage, as is the case with the NFL during the Super Bowl and Major League Baseball during the World Series; local network affiliates may continue to carry the local broadcast and are not forced to carry the Sports USA feed.

Commentators
Current
John Ahlers
Pat Foley
Judd Sirott
Nick Olczyk
Joe Micheletti
Brian Hayward
Billy Jaffe
Former
Kenny Albert
Bob Beers
Brian Boucher
Roxy Bernstein
Doug Brown
Bill Clement
Greg Dickerson 
Darren Eliot
Jim Fox
Ray Ferraro
Dave Goucher
Sean Grande
Steve Goldstein
Gary Green
Matt McConnell
Eddie Olczyk
Darren Pang
Howie Rose
Sam Rosen 
Sherry Ross
Dan Rusanowsky 
Dave Strader
Ralph Strangis 
Joe Tolleson
John Vanbiesbrouck

Stanley Cup Finals commentating crews

See also
National Hockey League on the radio

References

External links
NHL on NBC Sports Radio/Westwood One | Free Internet ...
NHL on NBC Sports Radio
Fang's Bites: Westwood One Radio's Announcing Assignments for the NHL Conference Finals
Fang's Bites: Westwood One Radio's Announcing Assignments for the NHL Stanley Cup Finals

Radio
American sports radio programs
1993 radio programme debuts
1990s American radio programs
2000s American radio programs
2010s American radio programs
NBC Sports Radio